Clemente Seguel Lacámara (born 23 November 1999) is a Chilean sailor. He competed in the Laser event at the 2020 Summer Olympics.

His first podium finish in the laser class at international level came in 2019, where he placed 2nd at the Laser Under-21 World Championship. He later went on to win the 2022 ILCA Senior (ILCA 4 & 7) Central & South American Championships, as well as placing 15th at the ILCA 7 Men's World Championship later that year.

Seguel is currently ranked 1st in the ILCA 7 men's rankings.

Notes

References

External links
 
 

1999 births
Living people
Chilean male sailors (sport)
Olympic sailors of Chile
Sailors at the 2014 Summer Youth Olympics
Sailors at the 2020 Summer Olympics – Laser
People from Temuco